The 1st Cavalry Division Artillery (DIVARTY) or "Red Team" is the Force Field Artillery Headquarters for the 1st Cavalry Division. The DIVARTY served with the division from 1941 to 2005, including combat service in World War II, the Korean War, the Vietnam War, Operations Desert Shield and Desert Storm, and Operation Iraqi Freedom and in peacetime in Japan, Korea, and Fort Hood, Texas. As the Force Fires Headquarters, the DIVARTY provides fire support coordination and mission command for the training and readiness of field artillery units across the division.

History

World War II
When first organized in July 1941, the 1st Cavalry Division Artillery consisted of Headquarters and Headquarters Battery, two horse-drawn 75mm battalions (the 82nd Field Artillery Battalion and the 61st Field Artillery Battalion), and a newly organized 105mm howitzer battalion (the 62nd Field Artillery Battalion) towed by trucks.  The 62nd Field Artillery was removed from the division for deployment to Europe in 1942, and replaced by the 99th Field Artillery Battalion. Before deploying to Australia, the two horse-drawn battalions fielded jeeps to replace their horses in order to save shipping space. From June - July, 1943, the DIVARTY deployed from Texas to California, and then on to Australia. In October 1943, another 105mm battalion, the 271st Field Artillery Battalion, was added to the division. In February - March, 1944, the Division Artillery participated in the Admiralty Islands campaign, with the 99th FAB landing with the 5th Cavalry Regiment, the 271st FAB landing with the 12th Cavalry Regiment, and 61st FAB landing with the 7th Cavalry Regiment

Korean War

In late 1957, as part of the Army's reorganization under the Pentomic structure, the DIVARTY returned to Korea, replacing the 24th Infantry Division. The headquarters was stationed Tonggu and later at Kaya Ri, a five-battery 105mm battalion (2nd Bn, 19th Arty) at Tonggu and later Ichon Ni, and a composite battalion of 155mm howitzers (twelve howitzers in two batteries), 8-in howitzers (a single four-gun battery) and Honest John rockets (a battery of two launchers) stationed at Tonggu and later at Pobwon-Ni.

Under a modified Pentomic structure from 1960 to 1963, the DIVARTY consisted of 5 direct support battalions armed with 105mm howitzers (3 towed and 2 self-propelled), and a composite battalion of 8-in howitzers and Honest John rockets.

Vietnam
On 1 July 1965, the Division Artillery, less personnel and equipment, returned to the United States, and reflagged elements of the 11th Air Assault Division (Test) and the 2nd Infantry Division at Fort Benning, Georgia.

Three battalions (2nd Bn, 19th Arty; 1st Bn, 21st Arty; and 1st Bn, 77th Arty) were 105mm towed battalions armed with the new M102 howitzer. The 2nd Bn, 20th Arty was an Aerial Rocket Artillery (ARA) battalion, consisting of three batteries, each with twelve UH-1B helicopters firing 2.75-inch rockets, while Btry E, 82nd Arty was an aviation battery with 20 helicopters for observation and other aviation support. Between July and September 1965, the newly organized 1st Cavalry Division Artillery departed Fort Benning for combat in Vietnam

Cold War

Global War on Terror

In preparation for deployment to Iraq, the division provisionally reorganized DIVARTY as a brigade combat team (BCT). On 6 April 2004, the DIVARTY assumed control of Al-Rashid district in Baghdad from the 1st Armored Division Artillery Combat Team. Operating as a provisional BCT, the DIVARTY's task organization included the 1st Battalion, 8th Cavalry Regiment; the 1st Squadron, 7th Cavalry Regiment; the 1st Battalion, 21st Field Artillery Regiment; Company B, 8th Engineer Battalion; the 515th Forward Support Battalion (Provisional); and the 2nd Battalion, 24th Marines. For a year, the "Red Team" conducted stability operations before returning to Fort Hood.

As part of the division's conversion to modular brigade combat teams, the DIVARTY was inactivated on 26 June 2005. On 2 April 2015, the DIVARTY was activated by reflagging the 41st Field Artillery Brigade.

Lineage & honors

Lineage 
Constituted 1 November 1940 in the Regular Army as Headquarters and Headquarters Battery, 1st Cavalry Division Artillery
Activated 3 January 1941 at Fort Bliss, Texas 
Reorganized and redesignated 4 December 1943 as Headquarters and Headquarters Battery, 1st Cavalry Division Artillery (Special)
Reorganizedand redesignated 25 March 1949 as Headquarters and Headquarters Battery, 1st Cavalry Division Artillery
Inactivated 26 June 2005 at Fort Hood, Texas
Activated 2 April 2015 at Fort Hood, Texas

Campaign credit

Decorations 
 Presidential Unit Citation (Army), Streamer embroidered PLEIKU PROVINCE (Headquarters and Headquarters Battery, 1st Cavalry Division Artillery, cited; DA GO 40, 1967)
 Valorous Unit Award, Streamer embroidered FISH HOOK (Headquarters and Headquarters Battery, 1st Cavalry Division Artillery, cited; DA GO 43, 1972)
 Meritorious Unit Commendation (Army), Streamer embroidered VIETNAM 1966–1967 (Headquarters and Headquarters Battery, 1st Cavalry Division Artillery, cited; DA GO 17, 1968)
 Meritorious Unit Commendation (Army), Streamer embroidered VIETNAM 1967–1969 (Headquarters and Headquarters Battery, 1st Cavalry Division Artillery, cited; DA GO 36, 1970)
 Meritorious Unit Commendation (Army), Streamer embroidered SOUTHWEST ASIA (Headquarters and Headquarters Battery, 1st Cavalry Division Artillery, cited; DA GO 27, 1994)
 Philippine Presidential Unit Citation, Streamer embroidered 17 OCTOBER 1941 TO 4 JULY 1945 (1st Cavalry Division cited; DA GO 47, 1950)
 Republic of Korea Presidential Unit Citation, Streamer embroidered WAEGWAN-TAEGU (Headquarters and Headquarters Battery, 1st Cavalry Division Artillery, cited; DA GO 35, 1951)
 Chryssoun Aristion Andrias (Bravery Gold Medal of Greece), Streamer embroidered KOREA (Headquarters and Headquarters Battery, 1st Cavalry Division Artillery, cited; DA GO 2, 1956)
 Republic of Vietnam Cross of Gallantry, with Palm, Streamer embroidered VIETNAM 1965–1969 (Headquarters and Headquarters Battery, 1st Cavalry Division Artillery, cited; DA GO 59, 1969)
 Republic of Vietnam Cross of Gallantry, with Palm, Streamer embroidered VIETNAM 1969–1970 (Headquarters and Headquarters Battery, 1st Cavalry Division, Artillery, cited; DA GO 42, 1972, as amended by DA GO 11, 1973)
 Republic of Vietnam Cross of Gallantry, with Palm, Streamer embroidered VIETNAM 1970–1971 (Headquarters and Headquarters Battery, 1st Cavalry Division, Artillery, cited; DA GO 42, 1972)
 Republic of Vietnam Civil Action Honor Medal, First Class, Streamer embroidered VIETNAM 1969–1970 (Headquarters and Headquarters Battery, 1st Cavalry Division Artillery, cited; DA GO 42, 1972)

See also
Korean War
Battle of Inchon
Vietnam War
Battle of Ia Drang
Airmobile
Field Artillery Branch (United States)
Field artillery
1st Cavalry Division (United States)
82nd Field Artillery Regiment

Notes

External links
 Official Unit Homepage
 Facebook Page

001
Military units and formations established in 1941